Bijayananda Patnaik (5 March 1916 – 17 April 1997) was an Indian politician, aviator and businessman. As politician, he served twice as the Chief Minister of the State of Odisha.

Early life 
His parents lived near Bhanjanagar, Ganjam district, around 80 km from Bramhapur. He was educated at Ravenshaw College in Odisha but, due to his interest in aviation, dropped out and trained as a pilot. Patnaik flew with private airlines but at the start of the Second World War he joined the Royal Indian Air Force. He eventually became the head of air transport command. While in service, he developed an interest in nationalist politics and used air force transports to deliver what was seen as subversive literature to Indian troops. He was jailed by the British for dropping political leaflets to Indian soldiers fighting under British command in Burma and flying clandestine missions that carried Congress Party leaders from hideouts across India to secret meetings that charted the independence struggle. However Patnaik remained committed to fighting the Axis Powers.

Role in Indonesian freedom struggle

Biju Patnaik met with Jawaharlal Nehru during his participation in Indonesian freedom struggle and became one of his trusted friends. Nehru viewed the freedom struggle of the Indonesian people as parallel to that of India, and viewed Indonesia as a potential ally. When the Dutch attempted to quell Indonesian independence on 21 July 1947, President Sukarno ordered Sjahrir, the former prime minister of Indonesia, to leave the country to attend the first Inter-Asia Conference, organised by Nehru, in July 1947 and to foment international public opinion against the Dutch. Sjahrir was unable to leave as the Dutch controlled the Indonesian sea and air routes. Nehru asked Biju Patnaik, who was adventurous and an expert pilot, to rescue Sjahrir and other Indonesian resistance fighters who were fighting their Dutch colonisers. Biju Patnaik and his wife Gyanwati, flew to Java, dodging the Dutch guns, he entered Indonesian airspace and landed on an improvised airstrip near Jakarta. Using left-over fuel from abandoned Japanese military dumps, Patnaik took off with prominent rebels, including Sultan Sjahrir and Achmad Sukarno, for a secret meeting with Nehru at New Delhi and brought out on a Douglas C-47 (Dakota) military aircraft reaching India via Singapore on 24 July 1947. For this act of bravery, Patnaik was given honorary citizenship in Indonesia and awarded the 'Bhoomi Putra', the highest Indonesian award, rarely granted to a foreigner. In 1995, when Indonesia was celebrating its 50th Independence Day, Biju Patnaik was awarded the highest national award, the Bintang Jasa Utama.

In 2015, Sukarno's daughter Megawati Sukarnoputri recounted how it was Patnaik who suggested she be named Meghavati or "daughter of clouds". She, whose full name is Diah Permata Megawati Setiawati Sukarnoputri, later became Indonesia's first female president, serving from 2001 to 2004.

In 2021, the Indonesian Embassy in New Delhi designated a room on the name of Biju Patnaik. On the walls of the Biju Patnaik room are photographs, newspaper clippings and letters that document Mr. Patnaik's secret assignments to fly out Indonesian leaders, as well as his relations with the Indonesian leadership.

Landing with DC-3
Biju Patnaik flew many sorties on his Dakota DC-3 from Delhi Safdarjung Airport on 27 October 1947, after the first Dakota DC-3 (Reg. No: VP 905) flown by Wg. Cdr. KL Bhatia landed in Srinagar Airport early morning. He brought 17 soldiers of 1-Sikh regiment commanded by Lt. Col. Dewan Ranjit Rai. He flew low on the airstrip twice to ensure that no raiders were around. Instructions from Prime Minister Nehru's office were clear: If the airport was taken over by the enemy, he was not to land. Taking a full circle the DC-3 flew ground level. Anxious eyeballs peered from inside the aircraft – only to find the airstrip empty. Nary a soul was in sight. The raiders were busy distributing the spoils of war amongst them in Baramulla.

Politics in independent India

Patnaik's political ideals were centered in socialism and federalism. His strong advocacy for equal resources to all Indian states who needed such, made him a champion of his Odia constituents.

In 1946 Patnaik was elected uncontested to the Odisha Legislative Assembly from North Cuttack constituency. In 1952 and 1957 he won from Jagannathprasad and Surada, respectively. In 1960 he assumed the presidency of the state Congress. Under his leadership, the Congress Party won 82 of 140 seats and Patnaik (representing Chowdwar constituency) became the chief minister of Odisha on 23 June 1961 and remained in the position until 2 October 1963 when he resigned from the post under the Kamaraj Plan to revitalise the Congress party. He was the Chief Minister of Odisha at the age of 45.

Patnaik was close to Indira Gandhi who took over the Congress Party in 1967. However, they clashed in 1969 over the Presidential election. He left the Congress and formed a regional party—the Utkal Congress. In the 1971 assembly poll, his party did reasonably well. Patnaik then re-established contact with his old friend Jayaprakash Narayan and plunged into the JP movement as it picked up momentum in 1974. When the Emergency was declared in 1975, Biju Patnaik was one of the first to be arrested along with other opposition leaders.

He was released in 1977. Later, in the same year, he was elected to the Lok Sabha for the first time from Kendrapara and became Union minister for steel and mines in both the Morarji Desai and the Charan Singh governments until 1979. He was re-elected to the Lok Sabha again in 1980 and 1984 from Kendrapara as Janata Party candidate despite the Congress wave in 1984 following Indira Gandhi's death. With the Congress defeat in 1989, he bounced back into the political limelight. However, after playing a key behind-the-scenes role in manoeuvring V. P. Singh to the Prime Minister's post, he again chose to go back to Odisha, and prepared for the assembly election. In 1990 state assembly election, the Janata Dal received a thumping majority (two-thirds of the assembly seats) which saw Biju Patnaik being the Chief Minister of Odisha for the second time until 1995.

Patnaik was re-elected to the Lok Sabha in 1996 from Cuttack and Aska constituencies as a Janata Dal candidate. He retained the latter until his death on 17 April 1997 of cardio-respiratory failure.

In 1992, Bijayananda Patnaik left this quote for the people of Odisha;

"In my dream of the 21st century for the State, I would have young men and women who put the interest of the State before them. They will have pride in themselves, confidence in themselves. They will not be at anybody's mercy, except their own selves. By their brains, intelligence and capacity, they will recapture the history of Kalinga."

Achievements as a public representative

Biju Patnaik set up Kalinga tubes, Kalinga Airlines, Kalinga Iron work, Kalinga Refractories and the Kalinga, a daily Oriya newspaper. In 1951 he established the international Kalinga Prize for popularisation of Science and Technology among the people and entrusted the responsibility to the UNESCO. The projects which he was known to have spearheaded includes the Port of Paradip, Orissa aviation centre, Bhubaneswar Airport, the Cuttack-Jagatpur Mahanadi highway bridge, Regional Engineering College, Rourkela, Sainik School Bhubaneswar, Orissa University of Agriculture and Technology-Bhubaneswar, NALCO (National Aluminum Company), Talcher Thermal Power Station, Balimela Hydel Project, HAL-Sunabeda and the Choudwar & Barbil industrial belts.

He also established the Kalinga Cup in football.

Family 

Biju Patnaik was married to Gyan Patnaik, who belonged to Punjab, due to which he is known as a son-in-law of Punjab as well. Just like Biju his wife too was a pilot. In fact, she was the first Indian lady to get a commercial pilot's license. In the 1940s, Gyan Patnaik accompanied Biju in the freedom struggle movement and evacuation of British families from Rangoon when the Japanese laid siege on the region.

Biju Patnaik's younger son, Naveen Patnaik, is the current Chief Minister of Odisha. His daughter, Gita Mehta, is an English writer. His elder son Prem Patnaik is a Delhi-based industrialist.

Commemoration 

The Government of Odisha has named several institutions after the name of Biju Patanaik. They include the Biju Patnaik Airport at Bhubaneswar, the Biju Patnaik University of Technology, Biju Patnaik Stadium at Nalco Nagar, Angul etc. Also his son Naveen Patnaik made his birthday 5 March as the Panchayat Raj Divas, a holiday in Odisha in his memory. The Biju Patnaik 5 Rupee commemorative coin was released in 2016. The glimpse of Biju Patnaik's stature can be understood by the fact that when he died, his coffin was wrapped in the national flags of India, Russia, and Indonesia.

Personal life 
An avid Bridge player, Patnaik was the father of author Gita Mehta, Odisha Chief Minister Naveen Patnaik and Prem Patnaik.

Legislative history

See also
 List of Chief Ministers of Odisha
 Biju Sena

References

External links

 New York Times article on Biju Patnaik
 Biju Patnaik: The Vision of a Patriot
 Tribute to Patnaik

1916 births
1997 deaths
Chief Ministers of Odisha
Indian independence activists from Odisha
Brahmos
India MPs 1977–1979
India MPs 1980–1984
India MPs 1984–1989
India MPs 1996–1997
Utkal Congress politicians
Members of the Odisha Legislative Assembly
V. P. Singh administration
Indian aviators
Lok Sabha members from Odisha
Rajya Sabha members from Odisha
People from Ganjam district
People from Kendrapara district
Indians imprisoned during the Emergency (India)
Leaders of the Opposition in Odisha
Chief ministers from Indian National Congress
Chief ministers from Janata Dal
Janata Dal politicians
Indian National Congress politicians from Odisha
Janata Party politicians
People from Cuttack
Janata Party (Secular) politicians
Orissa MLAs 1961–1967